The Best of Max Webster is an album by the Canadian rock band Max Webster. The album was released in 1989, eight years after Max Webster disbanded. One song from lead singer and guitarist Kim Mitchell's first solo EP, "Kids in Action", is included in the compilation.

Track listing 
All tracks composed by Kim Mitchell and Pye Dubois, except as indicated.
 "Check"
 "High Class in Borrowed Shoes"
 "A Million Vacations" (Gary McCracken/Dubois)
 "Diamonds, Diamonds"
 "Let Go the Line" (Terry Watkinson)
 "Night Flights" (Watkinson/Dubois)
 "The Party"
 "Hangover" (Live)
 "Kids in Action"
 "Gravity"
 "Paradise Skies"
 "Words to Words"
 "Oh War!"
 "Here Among the Cats"
 "Waterline" (Live)
 "Battle Scar"

Personnel
Kim Mitchell - guitar and vocals
Paul Kersey - drums and percussion 
Gary McCracken - drums and percussion 
Mike Tilka - bass guitar and vocals 
Dave Myles - bass guitar 
Terry Watkinson - keyboards and vocals 
Pye Dubois - lyrics

Additional personnel
Neil Peart - drums 
Alex Lifeson- guitar 
Geddy Lee - bass guitar, vocals 
David Stone – synthesizer 
Doug Riley – piano 
Robert Sinclair Wilson – bass guitar, vocals 
Paul DeLong – drums 
Peter Fredette, Bernie LaBarge – background vocals

Resources
 https://web.archive.org/web/20051215200834/http://www.maxwebster.ca/

References

Max Webster albums
1989 greatest hits albums
Anthem Records compilation albums